Grand Bend Airport  is located  southeast of Grand Bend, Ontario, Canada.

History

The airport was originally established as RCAF Detachment Grand Bend by the RCAF in 1942 as a relief, or auxiliary, aerodrome for student pilots training with No. 9 Service Flying Training School at RCAF Station Centralia. Grand Bend was home to No. 1 Flying Control School from 1951 to 1957. The station was used by Centralia until 1961 when it began use with the Canadian Army. It was given back to the RCAF in 1962 and was used by RCAF Station Centralia until the aerodrome closed in 1963. Subsequent owners of the property were Eagleson Construction, John Twynsta Holdings Ltd and the Grand Bend Motorplex.

Today the Grand Bend Motorplex uses the original runway 13/31 as a drag racing track. Runway 01/19 is now an access to the dragstrip and also the Grand Bend Speedway oval and Grand Bend Motocross dirt bike tracks. The remaining runway 07/25 of the airfield is shared by the Grand Bend Raceway, the Grand Bend Sport Parachuting Center and some local private aircraft. The only RCAF building that remains is the hangar, with the control tower perched on top. That property was subsequently owned by Bell Aerospace, Exeter plastics and P.O.G.

References

 Bruce Forsyth's Canadian Military History Page
 Grand Bend Sport Parachuting Center
 Grand Bend Motorplex

Registered aerodromes in Ontario